Guangzong Temple, more commonly known as the Tongwadian, is a Buddhist temple located on Mount Wutai, in Taihuai Town of Wutai County, Shanxi, China.

History
According to Records of Qingliang Mountain, the temple was first construction by Zhengde Emperor in 1507 under the Ming dynasty (1368–1644) and rebuilt in the following Qing dynasty (1644–1911).

Guangzong Temple has been inscribed as a National Key Buddhist Temple in Han Chinese Area in 1983.

Architecture
Guangzong Temple occupies a total area  with 28 rooms and halls.

Main Hall
The Main Hall, also known as "Grand Buddha Hall", is divided into upper and lower storeys with double-eaves gable and hip roofs.

The upper storey enshrining the Three Saints of Hua-yan. In the middle is Sakyamuni, statues of Manjushri and Samantabhadra stand on the left and right sides of Sakyamuni's statue. The statues of Eighteen Arhats stand on both sides.

And the lower storey enshrining the Three Sages of the West, namely Guanyin, Amitabha and Mahasthamaprapta.

Stupa of Master Fazun
After the Parinirvana of Master Fazun, monks of Guangzong Temple elected a stupa for him.

References

Buddhist temples on Mount Wutai
Buildings and structures in Xinzhou
Tourist attractions in Xinzhou
Wutai County